Transportation and Communications in Mexico may refer to:

 Communications in Mexico
 Transportation in Mexico